Adurim is a  town mentioned in the Bible and the Apocrypha and related information. This town is listed by different sources as Adurim, Adoraim, Adora and Dora. During the early Roman period, the city was inhabited by Edomites. Today, the place corresponds with Dura, near Hebron.

Etymology
The city was called by Macabees Adora (1 Macc. 13.20). According to Guy Le Strange, the city locality is in the Vale of Mamre mentioned in the story of The Twelve Spies who brought back to Moses large grapes of Eshkol as recorded in the Book of Numbers.

Mentioned as Adora by Apocrypha and often by Josephus. A weak letter is usually lost in Hebrew to Arabic sound conversion, such as in the case of Adoraim to Dura. A loss of a first feeble letter is not uncommon and the form of Dora could be found as early as in several instances of Josephus writings.

Apocrypha and biblical references
 
According to the International Standard Bible Encyclopedia: "ADOR, ā'dor, ADORA, a-dō'ra (’Αδωρά, Adōrá): In Idumaea, mentioned in Ant, XIII, ix, 1 as one of the cities captured by Hyrcanus, and referred to in 1 Maccabees 13 20."

Some believe Noah, the tenth of the pre-flood Patriarchs, as the story of Noah's Ark is told in the Hebrew Bible, is buried in Dura. The city was fortified by Rehoboam (974 BC – 913 BC), King of the United Monarchy of Israel and later the King of the Kingdom of Judah, who was a son of Solomon and a grandson of David, according to 2 Chron. 11.9. The city was called Adora in the First Book of Maccabees (1 Macc. 13.20).

According to the biblical account, Adurim was fortified by Rehoboam (974 BC – 913 BC), King of the United Monarchy of Israel and later the King of the Kingdom of Judah, who was a son of Solomon and a grandson of David. In the early 6th century BC the Babylonians attacked the Kingdom of Judah, the southern part of the country, from Adoraim near Hebron to Maresha and beyond, fell to the Edom.  The settlement is mentioned in the Zenon Papyri in 259 BC as a "fortress city".

Historical sources and archaeology

Babylonian period
In the early 6th century BCE the Babylonians attacked the Kingdom of Judah, and the southern part of the country, from Adoraim near Hebron to Maresha and beyond, fell to Edom.

Hellenistic period
Following Alexander the Great's conquest, the village population preserved their traditional way of life, however Jewish urban centers such as Adoraim exhibited a degree of hellenisation. The settlement is mentioned in the Zenon Papyri in 259 BCE as a "fortress city". In Adora, Simon Maccabeus stopped the advancing army of Diodotus Tryphon in 142 BCE. 

According to Josephus, John Hyrcanus captured the city after the death of Antiochus VII in 129 BCE. The city inhabitants, who were alleged to have been of Esau's progeny (Idumeans), were forced to convert to Judaism during the reign of Hyrcanus, on the condition that they be allowed to remain in the country. Hyrcanus "hired foreign troops, dismantled Adora and Marissa, the strong places of Edom, and forced the Edomites to accept the Jewish religion and submit to circumcision. This is the first instance of forcible conversion in Jewish history."

Roman period
Adora may have been the administrative center of the district of eastern Idumaea established by the Roman consul Aulus Gabinius, though other possibilities have been suggested.

See also 
 Dura, Hebron
 Adora, Har Hebron

References

Bibliography

Places in the deuterocanonical books
Books of the Maccabees